David Rangel may refer to:
David Rangel (footballer, born 1969), Mexican footballer
David Rangel (footballer, born 1979), Spanish footballer